The Selbitz is a river of Bavaria and Thuringia, Germany.

It is a left-bank tributary of the river Saale in the eastern Franconian Forest. It is a watercourse of tertiary importance.

In the village of Hölle, a district of Naila on the left bank of the Selbitz, a  mineral spring, the Höllensprudel, has been bored. During the Cold War division of Germany (1945–1990), the Selbitz was part of the inner German border, with fences and guard towers on the Thuringian side in the German Democratic Republic to prevent east-west traffic.

The footbridge between the Bavarian hamlet of Untereichenstein and Blankenstein is also the end of the Thuringian Rennsteig, a historical border path.

The name "Selbitz" probably comes from the Slavic word zelenovica and would therefore mean something like "green stream".

At almost any point the level of the Selbitz could rise theoretically without causing any problems, because it is mostly surrounded by meadows and in the town of Naila flows through a natural, but reinforced, channel between the station and the bridge by the football pitch. This enables the river to grow to more than twice its width during times of thaw, storms or heavy rain. From 2 to 4 December 2007 this could be observed. The area through which the river runs is surrounded to the left and right by strips of grassland that are used as meadows for sheep-grazing during times of the year when there is no snow.

See also
List of rivers of Bavaria

References

Literature

External links 

 Online data from the gauge at Hölle der Selbitz

Rivers of Bavaria
Rivers of Germany